Mehrenjan (also Romanized as Mehrenjān and Mehranjān) is a village in Balyan Rural District, in the Central District of Kazerun County, Fars Province, Iran. At the 2016 census, its population was 3,598, in 970 families.

References 

Populated places in Kazerun County